Thyreochaetus hirsutus is a species of beetle in the family Carabidae, the only species in the genus Thyreochaetus.

References

Lebiinae